, provisional designation , is a trans-Neptunian object and centaur on highly inclined and eccentric orbit in the outer region of the Solar System. It was discovered on 4 December 2002, by American astronomer Marc Buie at the Kitt Peak National Observatory in Arizona, United States.

Orbit and classification 

 orbits the Sun at a distance of 21–114 AU once every 552 years and 1 month (201,654 days; semi-major axis of 67.3 AU). Its orbit has an eccentricity of 0.69 and an inclination of 78° with respect to the ecliptic. The body's observation arc begins with its official discovery observation at Kitt Peak in December 2002.

This object belongs to the short-lived population of centaurs. Generically, it is also classified as a trans-Neptunian object as its semi-major axis is larger than Neptune's 30.1 AU. Due to this highly inclined and eccentric orbit, and with a Tisserand's parameter of only 1.167, its cometary-like orbit resembles that of the damocloid and extended-centaur population. It is one of few objects with and inclination above 60° and a perihelion below 15 AU, along with the first discovered .

Physical characteristics 

 has a BB–BR taxonomy type. It shows only a moderately red surface with a spectral gradient similar to the known comets, extinct comets, Jupiter trojans, Neptune trojans, irregular satellites and damocloids.

With a B–R magnitude of 1.2, the difference between the blue and red filter magnitude, it is still redder than the spectrum of the Sun (which is 1.02 mag). It has an absolute magnitude of 8.0.

Diameter and albedo 

According to the survey carried out by the NEOWISE mission of NASA's Wide-field Infrared Survey Explorer,  measures 170 kilometers in diameter and its surface has a low albedo of 0.04. Due to its small size, Brown does not consider it to be dwarf-planet candidate, grouping it into the "probably not"-category of his classification scheme (also see list of candidates).

Rotation period 

As of 2018, no rotational lightcurve of this object has been obtained from photometric observations. The object's rotation period, pole and shape remain unknown.

Numbering and naming 

This minor planet was numbered by the Minor Planet Center on 14 March 2006. It has not yet received an official name.

References

External links 
 Asteroid Lightcurve Database (LCDB), query form (info )
 Discovery Circumstances: Numbered Minor Planets (125001)-(130000) – Minor Planet Center
 

Centaurs (small Solar System bodies)
Trans-Neptunian objects
Damocloids
Discoveries by Marc Buie
20021204